Colombian handicraft history can be traced back to the Stone Age to the lithic instruments in El Abra stadial. Some of the first pottery samples known in Colombia were found in the Neolithic 3 — Pottery Neolithic (PN) Zipacón settlements.  The earliest examples of goldwork have been attributed to the Tumaco people of the Pacific coast and date to around 325 BCE.   Gold would play a pivotal role in luring the Spanish to the area now called Colombia during the 16th century (See: El Dorado).

Colombian arts and crafts can be categorised into two major divisions:

Traditional

Contemporary/Modern

patina products, puzzle toys, macramé (knot crafts), fique products, leather products, modern silver jewellery gift ware, decorative items, dolls & puppets, bead Crafts, bone & horn pharoducts, natural buttons etc. are some of the modern forms of Colombian handicrafts.

See also

 Artesanías de Colombia, S.A.

References